The Gâm River (Bainan he) is a river which derived from the Guangxi, China.

The river enters the Vietnam territory at Cao Bằng Province, .

And then rivers in Hà Giang Province and Tuyên Quang Province, Vietnam.

References

Rivers of Guangxi
Rivers of Cao Bằng province
Rivers of Hà Giang province
Rivers of Tuyên Quang province
Rivers of Vietnam